Sunrise Point may refer to:

 A viewpoint in Bryce Canyon National Park
 The codename for an Intel chipset, see List of Intel chipsets#LGA 1151 rev 1